Timsfors is a locality situated in Markaryd Municipality, Kronoberg County, Sweden with 637 inhabitants in 2010.

References 

Populated places in Kronoberg County
Populated places in Markaryd Municipality
Finnveden